Reduction (also Flynns) is an unincorporated community in South Huntingdon Township, Westmoreland County, Pennsylvania. United States. The community is located on the Youghiogheny River. Its population is 60, down from a peak of 400.

History
American Reduction Company, a garbage processing company, founded the community to provide housing for its workers at a local garbage plant. The plant closed in 1936, and in 1948, John Stawovy bought the town for $10,000. Their son David put the community up for sale again in 2017.

Notes

Unincorporated communities in Westmoreland County, Pennsylvania
Unincorporated communities in Pennsylvania
Company towns in Pennsylvania